Francis James Roscoe (December 28, 1830 – December 20, 1878) was a Canadian entrepreneur and Member of Parliament.

Francis Roscoe was born in Liverpool, England, the son of W.S. Roscoe, was educated at University College and the University of London and came to British Columbia in 1862, settling in the Ross Bay area of Victoria, British Columbia.  He was the younger brother of poet William Caldwell Roscoe and the grandson of English historian and writer William Roscoe. In 1864, he married Anna Letitia Le Breton, daughter of Anna Letitia Le Breton. Roscoe was a partner in several hardware and ironware ventures.  In 1870, he became the Commissioner of Savings Banks for the British Columbia colony.  Roscoe stood for election as an Independent Liberal candidate in the Canadian federal election in 1874 in the two-member Victoria riding.  He placed second in a close three-way race and was elected along with Liberal incumbent Amor De Cosmos.

Roscoe did not stand for re-election in 1878 and died later in the year in Victoria at the age of 47.  He was replaced in the seat by incoming Prime Minister John A. Macdonald who had lost his Ontario seat earlier as the BC portion of the election was delayed, and because he was deemed unelectable in eastern Canada due to ongoing politics surrounding his role in the Pacific Scandal.

Roscoe's Victoria home is today preserved by The Ross Bay Villa Society as a rare example of a pre-Confederation colonial house.

References 

1831 births
1878 deaths
Independent Liberal MPs in Canada
Members of the House of Commons of Canada from British Columbia
English emigrants to pre-Confederation British Columbia
Politicians from Liverpool